Red Cord Records is an American record label from Rockford, Illinois. The label started in September 2008, but went on hiatus in 2014. The label signed bands including Phinehas, Random Hero, and Inhale Exhale. and Bloodline Severed

Background
Red Cord Records started in 2008. From there the label signed hardcore punk bands such as A Past Unknown and From the Eyes of Servants, rock bands such as This City Awaits, metalcore bands such as Inhale Exhale, and deathcore/death metal acts like Your Chance to Die and Solomon. In 2011, the label aligned themselves with Victory Records for distribution purposes. The label signed a few more bands including Least of These and This City Awaits in 2014.

References

External links
 Red Cord Records on Myspace
 Archive Tags on Indie Vision Music
 Archive Tags on The Metal Resource
 Archive Tags on New Noise Magazine
 Archive Tags on Highwire Daze
 
 

Heavy metal record labels
American record labels
Christian record labels
Hardcore record labels